

R07A Other respiratory system products

R07AA Lung surfactants
R07AA01 Colfosceril palmitate
R07AA02 Natural phospholipids
R07AA30 Combinations

R07AB Respiratory stimulants
R07AB01 Doxapram
R07AB02 Nikethamide
R07AB03 Pentetrazol
R07AB04 Etamivan
R07AB05 Bemegride
R07AB06 Prethcamide
R07AB07 Almitrine
R07AB08 Dimefline
R07AB09 Mepixanox
R07AB52 Nikethamide, combinations
R07AB53 Pentetrazol, combinations
QR07AB99 Respiratory stimulants, combinations

R07AX Other respiratory system products
R07AX01 Nitric oxide
R07AX02 Ivacaftor
R07AX30 Ivacaftor and lumacaftor
R07AX31 Ivacaftor and tezacaftor
R07AX32 Ivacaftor, tezacaftor and elexacaftor

References

R07